Bullita Cave, also known as Burkes Backyard Cave, is a cave located in Gregory National Park of the Northern Territory, Australia. It is one of the longest surveyed caves in both Australia and the world.

Location and structure 
Bullita Cave is part of a network of caves located close together within Gregory National Park. The cave contains a large number of holes which open up at the surface, revealing daylight, and some whole sections which are completely exposed, as well as fissures within its tunnels. Beneath the Surface: A Natural History of Australian Caves describes the cave as a "complex close-spaced maze system."

Exploration 
Operation Raleigh investigated the cave in an expedition in 1990; this was the first time that it was significantly explored. In 1992, further sections of the cave were found. John Dunkley, an educator and caver who is currently a member of the Australian Speleological Federation, explored and observed the cave throughout the late 20th and early 21st century. He began surveying it in the 1990s and continued to do so until 2008, stating that a cave with as large of a size as Bullita would take a long time to survey. He discovered multiple features and statistics about the cave during his exploration.

Length 
Bullita Cave, as surveyed, is one of the longest caves currently known in Australia,  with multiple older sources claiming it is the longest cave in the country.

Bullita Cave is also one of the longest caves in the world. The exact position of the cave on the list of longest caves also varies across sources; the Encyclopedia of Caves and Karst Science names it as the 18th longest while Caves for the Uninitiated claims it's the 15th.

See also
List of longest caves

References 

Caves of the Northern Territory